Convent Station could refer to:

Convent Station, New Jersey, an unincorporated community in Morris Township, New Jersey
Convent Station (NJT station), an NJ Transit rail station on the Morristown Line